Pampered Youth is a 1925 American silent drama film directed by David Smith and starring Cullen Landis, Alice Calhoun, and Allan Forrest. It is an adaption of the 1918 novel The Magnificent Ambersons by Booth Tarkington. It was one of the final films produced by Vitagraph Studios before the firm was absorbed into Warner Bros.

Plot
As described in a review in a film magazine, twenty-five or thirty years ago, every small town boasted of its Amberson family, whose home was the show place and whose every move made news. Major Amberson's (King) daughter Isabel (Calhoun) loves Eugene Morgan (Forrest), but he gets himself in disgrace by performing a drunken serenade, and leaves town. Isabel marries Wilbur Minafer (MacDonald), a poor second choice, who makes a very passable husband. Not loving her husband, Isabel centers all of the love in her heart upon her son George, who naturally grows from a very spoiled young boy into a despicable young cad. His extravagances eventually deplete the Amberson fortune. When his father dies, George resents his mother's love for Morgan, who has returned as a prosperous automobile manufacturer. George has come to love, however, Morgan's daughter Lucy (Merriam). The death of Major Amberson forces George to go to work, bringing about his regeneration. Then there is the heroic rescue of Isabel by Morgan when the home in which she lodges burns. The final tableau suggests the rehabilitation of George.

Cast

Preservation
The complete feature is a lost film. However, a 28 minute abridgement survives and it was included on the Criterion edition of The Magnificent Ambersons Blu-Ray release.

References

Bibliography
 Goble, Alan. The Complete Index to Literary Sources in Film. Walter de Gruyter, 1999.

External links

Review of the Magnificent Ambersons Criterion release

1925 films
1925 drama films
Silent American drama films
Films directed by David Smith (director)
American silent feature films
1920s English-language films
American black-and-white films
Vitagraph Studios films
1920s American films